There are natural history museums in all 50 of the United States and the District of Columbia. The oldest such museum, the Academy of Natural Sciences in Philadelphia, Pennsylvania, was founded in 1812.

Alabama
Alabama Museum of Natural History, Tuscaloosa
Anniston Museum of Natural History, Anniston
Auburn University Museum of Natural History, Auburn
Cook's Natural Science Museum, Decatur
Dauphin Island Sea Lab, Dauphin Island
Mann Wildlife Learning Museum, Montgomery
McWane Science Center, Birmingham
Southern Environmental Center, Birmingham
Weeks Bay Interpretive Center, Fairhope

Alaska
Alaska Museum of Science and Nature, Anchorage
Alaska State Centennial Museum, Juneau
Pratt Museum, Homer
Southeast Alaska Discovery Center, Ketchikan
University of Alaska Museum of the North, Fairbanks

Arizona
Arizona Mining and Mineral Museum, Phoenix
Arizona Museum of Natural History, Mesa
Arizona-Sonora Desert Museum, Tucson
Center for Meteorite Studies, Arizona State University, Tempe
International Wildlife Museum, Tucson
Meteor Crater, Winslow
Museum of Northern Arizona, Flagstaff
Petrified Forest National Park, Navajo County
Tohono Chul Park, Tucson
University of Arizona Mineral Museum, Tucson

Arkansas
Arkansas Museum of Discovery, Little Rock
Arkansas River Visitor Center, Russellville
Turner Neal Museum of Natural History, Monticello
White River National Wildlife Refuge, DeWitt

California
Arcata Marsh Interpretive Center, Arcata
Bohart Museum of Entomology, University of California, Davis, Davis
Bowers Museum, Santa Ana
Buena Vista Museum of Natural History, Bakersfield
California Academy of Sciences, San Francisco
California Mining and Mineral Museum, Mariposa
Carolyn Parr Nature Center, Napa
Chico Creek Nature Center, Chico
CuriOdyssey, San Mateo
Entomology Research Museum, University of California, Riverside, Riverside
Essig Museum of Entomology, University of California, Berkeley, Berkeley
Fallbrook Gem and Mineral Society Museum, Fallbrook
Fossil Discovery Center of Madera County, Chowchilla
Gateway Science Museum, Chico
Gaumer's Jewelry & Museum, Red Bluff
Giant Forest Museum, Tulare County
Gray Lodge Wildlife Area, Gridley
Great Valley Museum of Natural History, Modesto
Heritage of the Americas Museum, Rancho San Diego
Hi-Desert Nature Museum, Yucca Valley
Human Evolution Research Center, UC Berkeley
Humboldt State University Natural History Museum, Arcata
Humboldt State University Wildlife Museum, Arcata
Imperial Valley College Desert Museum, Ocotillo
John D. Cooper Archaeological and Paleontological Center, Orange County
Joshua Tree National Park, Riverside & San Bernardino Counties
Junior Museum & Zoo, Palo Alto
Jurupa Mountains Discovery Center, Jurupa Valley
Klamath National Forest, Siskiyou County
Lassen Volcanic National Park, Redding
Lindsay Wildlife Experience, Walnut Creek
Loomis Museum, Shingletown
Maidu Museum & Historic Site, Roseville
Maturango Museum, Ridgecrest
Mono Basin National Scenic Area Visitor Center, Lee Vining
Morro Bay State Park Museum of Natural History, Morro Bay
Monterey Bay Aquarium, Monterey
Museum of Riverside, Riverside
Museum of Vertebrate Zoology, Berkeley
Museum of Wildlife and Fish Biology, Davis
Napa Valley Museum, Yountville
Natural History Museum of Los Angeles County, Los Angeles
Oakland Museum of California, Oakland
Pacific Grove Museum of Natural History, Pacific Grove
Page Museum - La Brea Tar Pits, Los Angeles
Petaluma Wildlife & Natural Science Museum, Petaluma
Phoebe A. Hearst Museum of Anthropology, UC Berkeley
Point Reyes National Seashore, Marin County
Point Vicente Interpretive Center, Rancho Palos Verdes
Randall Museum, Corona Heights Park, San Francisco
Ralph B. Clark Regional Park, Buena Park
Raymond M. Alf Museum of Paleontology, Claremont
San Bernardino County Museum, Redlands
San Diego Natural History Museum, San Diego
San Gabriel River Discovery Center, South El Monte
Santa Barbara Museum of Natural History, Santa Barbara
Santa Barbara Museum of Natural History Sea Center, Santa Barbara
Santa Cruz Museum of Natural History, Santa Cruz
Seymour Marine Discovery Center, Santa Cruz
Sierra College Natural History Museum, Rocklin
Tehama County Museum, Tehama
Turtle Bay Exploration Park, Redding
Western Science Center, Hemet
University of California Museum of Paleontology, UC Berkeley
University and Jepson Herbaria, UC Berkeley
Western Foundation of Vertebrate Zoology, Camarillo
World Museum of Natural History, La Sierra University, Riverside

Colorado
Denver Museum of Nature and Science, Denver
Rocky Mountain Dinosaur Resource Center, Woodland Park
May Natural History Museum, Colorado Springs
Morrison Natural History Museum, Morrison
Museum of Western Colorado's Dinosaur Journey Museum, Fruita
University of Colorado Museum of Natural History, Boulder
The Wildlife Experience, Parker

Connecticut
Bruce Museum of Arts and Science, Greenwich
Connecticut Audubon Society Birdcraft Museum and Sanctuary, Fairfield
Connecticut State Museum of Natural History, Storrs
Denison Pequotsepos Nature Center, Mystic
Dinosaur Place at Nature's Art Village, Montville
Dinosaur State Park and Arboretum, Rocky Hill
Earthplace, Westport
Northwest Park Nature Center, Windsor
Peabody Museum of Natural History at Yale University, New Haven
Peoples State Forest Nature Museum, Barkhamsted
Stamford Museum and Nature Center, Stamford
White Memorial Conservation Center, Litchfield
Wesleyan Joe Webb Peoples Museum of Natural History, at Wesleyan University, Middletown

Delaware
Delaware Center for Horticulture, Greenville
Delaware Mineralogical Society, Wilmington
Delaware Museum of Nature and Science, Wilmington
Iron Hill Museum & Science Center, Newark
University of Delaware Mineralogical Museum, Newark

District of Columbia
National Geographic Museum at Explorers Hall, Washington, D.C.
National Museum of Natural History, Smithsonian Institution, Washington, D.C.

Florida
Bailey-Matthews National Shell Museum, Sanibel
Bishop Museum of Science and Nature, Bradenton
Butterfly World, Coconut Creek
Calusa Nature Center and Planetarium, Fort Myers
Crane Point Museum, Nature Center and Historic Site, Marathon
Elsa Kimbell Environmental Education and Research Center, Hobe Sound
Rookery Bay Environmental Learning Center, Naples
Fairchild Tropical Botanic Garden, Coral Gables
Florida Keys Eco-Discovery Center, Key West
Florida Museum of Natural History, Gainesville
Huguenot Memorial Park Nature Center, Jacksonville
Fred Dana Marsh Museum, Ormond Beach
Harbor Branch Ocean Discovery Center, Fort Pierce
Historic Spanish Point, Osprey
Jacksonville University Life Sciences Museum, Jacksonville
Loggerhead Marinelife Center, Juno Beach
Marine Science Center, Ponce Inlet
Mulberry Phosphate Museum, Mulberry
Museum of Arts and Sciences, Daytona Beach
Museum of Dinosaurs and Ancient Cultures, Cocoa Beach
Museum of Science and History, Jacksonville
The Palm Beach Museum of Natural History, Wellington
Polk's Nature Discovery Center, Lakeland
Sandoway Discovery Center, Delray Beach
Silver River Museum, Silver Springs
SKELETONS: A Museum of Osteology, Orlando
Tallahassee Museum, Tallahassee
Terramar Visitor Center, Fort Lauderdale
Tree Hill Nature Center, Jacksonville
Weedon Island Preserve Cultural and Natural History Center, St. Petersburg

Georgia
Charlie Elliott Wildlife Center, Mansfield
Dauset Trails Nature Center, Jackson
Elachee Nature Science Center, Gainesville
Fernbank Museum of Natural History, Atlanta
Georgia Museum of Natural History, Athens
Georgia Southern University Museum, Statesboro
Go Fish Education Center, Perry
Museum of Arts and Sciences, Macon
Sapelo Island Visitors Center, Sapelo Island
Savannah-Ogeechee Canal Museum & Nature Center, Savannah
Tellus Science Museum, Cartersville
Tidelands Nature Center, Jekyll Island
West Georgia Museum, Tallapoosa
William P. Wall Museum of Natural History, Milledgeville

Hawai'i
Bernice P. Bishop Museum, Honolulu
Hawaii Nature Center, Maui
Kauaʻi Museum, Lihue
Kōke'e Museum, Kauai
Lucoral Museum, Honolulu
Lyman House Memorial Museum, Hilo
Mokupāpapa Discovery Center, Hilo
Nani Mau Gardens, Hilo

Idaho
Boise State University Vertebrate Museum, Boise
Canyon Crossroads Transportation Museum, Melba
Hagerman Fossil Beds National Monument, Hagerman
Herrett Center for Arts and Science, Twin Falls
Idaho Heritage Museum, Twin Falls
Idaho Museum of Natural History, Pocatello
MK Nature Center, Boise
Museum of Idaho, Idaho Falls
Orma J. Smith Museum of Natural History, Caldwell

Illinois
Burpee Museum of Natural History, Rockford
Elgin Public Museum, Elgin
Evelyn Pease Tyner Interpretive Center, Glenview
Field Museum of Natural History, Chicago
Fryxell Geology Museum, Rock Island
The Grove National Historic Landmark, Glenview
Henry N. Barkhausen Cache River Wetlands Center, Cypress
Jarrett Prairie Center, Byron
Jurica-Suchy Nature Museum, Benedictine University, Lisle
Illinois State Museum, Springfield
Midwest Museum of Natural History, Sycamore
Chicago Academy of Sciences/Peggy Notebaert Nature Museum, Chicago
Peoria Riverfront Museum, Peoria
Prairie Grass Nature Museum, Round Lake
Trailside Museum of Natural History, River Forest
Western Illinois University Museum of Geology, Macomb

Indiana
Evansville Museum of Arts, History and Science, Evansville
Falls of the Ohio State Park Interpretive Center, Clarksville
Hayes Arboretum, Richmond
The Children's Museum of Indianapolis, Indianapolis
Indiana State Museum, Indianapolis
Joseph Moore Museum, Richmond
Minnetrista, Muncie
Sumner B. Sheets Museum of Wildlife and Marine Exhibits, Huntington

Iowa
Dorothy Pecaut Nature Center, Sioux City
Fossil & Prairie Center, Rockford
Prairie Learning Center, Prairie City
Putnam Museum, Davenport
Sanford Museum & Planetarium, Cherokee
University of Iowa Museum of Natural History, Iowa City
University of Northern Iowa Museum, University of Northern Iowa, Cedar Falls
Voas Nature Area & Museum, Minburn

Kansas
Fick Fossil Museum, Oakley
Flint Hills Discovery Center, Manhattan
Great Plains Nature Center, Wichita
Johnston Geology Museum, Emporia
Kansas State University Insect Zoo, Manhattan
Keystone Gallery, Oakley
Museum at Prairiefire, Overland Park
Museum of World Treasures, Wichita
Pratt Education Center, Pratt
Schmidt Museum of Natural History, Emporia
Sternberg Museum of Natural History, Hays
University of Kansas Natural History Museum, Lawrence

Kentucky
American Cave Museum, Horse Cave
American Saddlebred Museum, Lexington
Ben E. Clement Mineral Museum, Marion
Big Bone Lick State Park, Big Bone
Cumberland Inn Museum - Henkelmann Life Science Collection, Williamsburg
Mammoth Cave Wildlife Museum, Cave City

Louisiana
Black Bayou Lake National Wildlife Refuge, Ouachita Parish
Cameron Prairie National Wildlife Refuge, Lake Charles
Jean Lafitte National Historical Park and Preserve, Marrero
Lafayette Science Museum, Lafayette
Louisiana Art and Science Museum, Baton Rouge
Louisiana Museum of Natural History, Baton Rouge
Touchstone Wildlife and Art Museum, Haughton
ULM Museum of Natural History, Monroe

Maine
Bar Harbor Whale Museum, Bar Harbor
George B. Dorr Museum of Natural History, Bar Harbor
International Cryptozoology Museum, Portland
Kenneth E. Stoddard Shell Museum, Boothbay
L. C. Bates Museum, Hinckley
Maine Art Glass Butterfly and Insect Museum, Lisbon Falls
Maine Gem and Mineral Museum, Bethel
Maine State Museum, Augusta
Monhegan Museum, Monhegan
Northern Maine Museum of Science, Presque Isle
Nylander Museum, Caribou
Project Puffin#Project Puffin Visitor Center, Rockland
Wilson Museum, Castine

Maryland
Blackwater National Wildlife Refuge Visitor Center, Dorchester County
Deep Creek Lake State Park Discovery Center, Garrett County
Eden Mill Nature Center, Pylesville
Irvine Nature Center, Owings Mills
Maryland Historical Society, Baltimore
Maryland Science Center, Baltimore
Patuxent Research Refuge, Laurel
Natural History Society of Maryland, Baltimore

Massachusetts
Bartholomew's Cobble, Sheffield
Beneski Museum of Natural History at Amherst College, Amherst
Berkshire Museum, Pittsfield
Blue Hills Trailside Museum, Norfolk County
Cape Cod Museum of Natural History, Brewster
EcoTarium, Worcester
Fisher Museum, Petersham
Great Falls Discovery Center, Turners Falls
Harvard Museum of Natural History, Cambridge
Marion Natural History Museum, Marion
Nash Dinosaur Track Site and Rock Shop, South Hadley
Natural Science Museum in Hinchman House, Nantucket
North Adams Museum of History and Science, North Adams
South Shore Natural Science Center, Norwell
Springfield Science Museum, Springfield

Michigan
A. E. Seaman Mineral Museum, Houghton
Besser Museum for Northeast Michigan, Alpena
Call of the Wild & Bavarian Falls Park, Gaylord
Card Wildlife Education Center and Wildlife Museum, Big Rapids
Carl T. Johnson Hunting and Fishing Center, Cadillac
Carnegie Museum of the Keweenaw, Houghton
Cranbrook Institute of Science, Bloomfield Hills
Gerald E. Eddy Discovery Center, Jackson & Washtenaw Counties
Gillette Sand Dune Visitor Center, Muskegon & Ottawa Counties
Gitchee Gumee Museum, Grand Marais
Historic Mill Creek Discovery Park, Mackinaw City
Inland Seas Education Center, Suttons Bay
Kalamazoo Valley Museum, Kalamazoo
Kingman Museum, Battle Creek
Lakeshore Museum Center, Muskegon
Marshlands Museum and Nature Center, Wayne County
Michigan State University Bug House, East Lansing
Michigan State University Museum, East Lansing
Michigan Whitetail Hall of Fame Museum, Grass Lake
Museum of Cultural & Natural History, Mount Pleasant
Ottawa Visitor Center, Watersmeet
Spirit of the Woods Museum, Elk Rapids
University of Michigan Museum of Natural History, Ann Arbor

Minnesota
Bell Museum of Natural History, Saint Paul
Great Lakes Aquarium, Duluth
International Wolf Center, Ely
Moose Lake State Park Agate and Geological Interpretive Center, Carlton County
National Eagle Center, Wabasha
North American Bear Center, Ely
Raptor Ridge, Spicer
Redwood County Poor Farm, Redwood Falls
Science Museum of Minnesota, Saint Paul
SMSU Museum of Natural History, Marshall

Mississippi
Center for Marine Education and Research, Gulfport
Clinton Community Nature Center, Clinton
Grenada Lake Visitors Center Museum, Grenada
Gulf Islands National Seashore Visitor Center, Ocean Springs
Mississippi Entomological Museum, Mississippi State University, Starkville
Mississippi Museum of Natural Science, Jackson
Mississippi Petrified Forest, Flora
Museum of the Mississippi Delta, Greenwood
Scranton Nature Center, Pascagoula
Strawberry Plains Audubon Center, Holly Springs
Tunica RiverPark, Tunica Resorts

Missouri
Bollinger County Museum of Natural History, Marble Hill
Bonebrake Center of Nature and History, Salem
Branson Dinosaur Museum, Branson
Ed Clark Museum of Missouri Geology, Rolla
Enns Entomology Museum, Columbia
Harry S. Truman Regional Visitor Center, Warsaw
Jefferson Barracks Telephone Museum, Saint Louis
Joplin Museum Complex, Joplin
Kansas City Museum, Kansas City
Maramec Museum at Maramec Spring Park, St. James
Mastodon State Historic Site, St. Louis
Missouri State Museum, Jefferson City
Saint Louis Science Center, St. Louis
Ozark Natural & Cultural Resource Center, Salem
Remington Nature Center, Saint Joseph
Sophia M. Sachs Butterfly House, Chesterfield
Missouri Institute of Natural Science, Springfield
Stephens Museum, Fayette
Weldon Spring Site Interpretive Center, St. Charles
Wonders of Wildlife Museum & Aquarium, Springfield
World Aquarium, St. Louis

Montana
Carter County Museum, Ekalaka
Central Montana Museum, Lewistown
Fort Peck Interpretive Center, Fort Peck
Great Plains Dinosaur Museum and Field Station, Malta
Grizzly & Wolf Discovery Center, West Yellowstone
Makoshika Dinosaur Museum, Glendive
Montana Natural History Center, Missoula
Museum of the Rockies, Bozeman
North American Wildlife Museum, Coram
Philip L. Wright Zoological Museum, Missoula
Phillips County Museum, Malta
Rudyard Museum, Rudyard
Two Medicine Dinosaur Center, Bynum
Wildlife Museum of the West, Ennis

Nebraska
Agate Fossil Beds National Monument, Sioux County
Arbor Day Farm, Nebraska City
Ashfall Fossil Beds State Historical Park, Royal
Bartels Museum, Seward
Corps of Discovery Welcome Center, Crofton
Eleanor Barbour Cook Museum of Geology, Chadron
Hudson-Meng Bison Kill, Crawford
Hastings Museum, Hastings
Lewis and Clark Visitor Center, Cedar County
Petrified Wood Gallery, Ogallala
Pierson Wildlife Museum Learning Center, Neligh
River Country Nature Center, Nebraska City
Riverside Discovery Center, Scottsbluff
Schramm Park State Recreation Area, Gretna
Trailside Museum of Natural History, Fort Robinson State Park, Crawford
University of Nebraska State Museum, Lincoln
Willow Point Gallery, Ashland

Nevada
Great Basin National Park, Rhyolite
Las Vegas Natural History Museum, Las Vegas
Las Vegas Springs Preserve, Las Vegas
Marjorie Barrick Museum of Natural History, Las Vegas
Nevada State Museum, Carson City, Carson City
Nevada State Museum, Las Vegas, Las Vegas
Northeastern Nevada Museum, Elko
Pahrump Valley Museum, Pahrump
Wilbur D. May Center, Reno

New Hampshire
Amoskeag Fishways Learning and Visitors Center, Manchester
Great Bay Discovery Center, Greenland
Libby Museum, Wolfeboro
Loon Center, Moultonborough
Nature Discovery Center, Warner
Squam Lakes Natural Science Center, Holderness
Woodman Institute Museum, Dover

New Jersey
Discovery Shell Museum, Ocean City
Franklin Mineral Museum, Franklin
Insectropolis, Toms River
Marine Mammal Stranding Center, Brigantine
Morris Museum, Morristown
New Jersey State Museum, Trenton
Newark Museum, Newark
Poricy Park, Middletown Township
Rutgers University Geology Museum, New Brunswick
Trailside Nature & Science Center, Union County
Washington Crossing State Park Nature Center, Hopewell Township
The Wetlands Institute, Stone Harbor

New Mexico
American International Rattlesnake Museum, Albuquerque
Bolack Museum of Fish & Wildlife, Farmington
Capulin Volcano National Monument, Union County
Carlsbad Caverns National Park, Carlsbad
Dr. Antonio Gennaro Natural History Museum, Portales
El Morro National Monument, Ramah
Las Cruces Museum of Nature and Science, Las Cruces
Mesalands Community College's Dinosaur Museum, Tucumcari
Miles Mineral Museum, Portales
Museum of Southwestern Biology, University of New Mexico, Albuquerque
New Mexico Museum of Natural History and Science, Albuquerque
New Mexico State University Arthropod Museum, Las Cruces
Ruth Hall Museum of Paleontology, Abiquiú
Smokey Bear Historical Park, Capitan
White Sands National Park, Doña Ana and Otero Counties
Zuhl Museum, Las Cruces

New York
Albany Pine Bush Discovery Center, Albany
American Museum of Natural History, New York City
Buffalo Museum of Science, Buffalo
Caleb Smith State Park Preserve, Smithtown
Cave House Museum of Mining & Geology, Howes Cave
Charles Dickert Wildlife Collection, Saranac Lake
Cornell University Museum of Vertebrates, Ithaca
Emma Treadwell Thacher Nature Center, Voorheesville
Garvies Point Museum and Preserve, Glen Cove
Herkimer Diamond Mines Museum, Herkimer
Hicksville Gregory Museum, Hicksville
Hudson Highlands Nature Museum, Cornwall-on-Hudson
Hudson River Museum, Yonkers
Morrisville State College Wildlife Museum, Morrisville
Museum of Curiosities, Cazenovia
Museum of Long Island Natural Sciences, Stony Brook University, Stony Brook
Museum of the Earth, Ithaca
New York State Museum, Albany
Niagara Gorge Discovery Center, Niagara Falls
Niagara Science Museum, Niagara Falls
Paleontological Research Institution, Ithaca
Pember Museum of Natural History, Granville
Roberson Museum and Science Center, Binghamton
Robert M. Linsley Geology Museum, Hamilton
Roger Tory Peterson Institute of Natural History, Jamestown
South Fork Natural History Museum, Bridgehampton, New York
Tackapausha Museum and Preserve, Seaford
Tanglewood Nature Center & Museum, Elmira
Trailside Museums and Zoo, Bear Mountain State Park
Trailside Nature Museum, Cross River
Up Yonda Farm, Bolton Landing
Vanderbilt Museum, Centerport
Walter Elwood Museum, Amsterdam
Waterman Conservation Education Center, Apalachin
The Wild Center, Tupper Lake
Wildlife Sports and Educational Museum, Vail Mills
William B. Hoyt II Visitor Center, Mount Morris

North Carolina
Asheville Museum of Science, Asheville
Aurora Fossil Museum, Aurora
Cape Fear Museum, Wilmington
Centennial Campus Center for Wildlife Education, Raleigh
Core Sound Waterfowl Museum, Harkers Island
Corolla Wild Horse Museum, Corolla
Cradle of Forestry in America, Asheville
Discovery Place, Charlotte
Franklin Gem & Mineral Museum, Franklin
Frisco Native American Museum & Natural History Center, Frisco
Grandfather Mountain Nature Museum, Linville
Greensboro Science Center, Greensboro
Highlands Nature Center, Highlands
Jockey's Ridge State Park, Dare County
Lundy–Fetterman Museum & Exhibit Hall, Buies Creek
McKinney Geology Teaching Museum, Boone
Mineral and Lapidary Museum, Hendersonville
Mount Mitchell State Park, Yancey County
Museum of Coastal Carolina, Ocean Isle Beach
Museum of North Carolina Minerals, Spruce Pine
North Carolina Estuarium, Washington
North Carolina Maritime Museum, Beaufort
North Carolina Museum of Forestry, Whiteville
North Carolina Museum of Life and Science, Durham
North Carolina Museum of Natural Sciences, Raleigh
North Carolina Museum of Natural Sciences at Whiteville, Whiteville
Onslow County Museum, Richlands
Outer Banks Beachcomber Museum, Nags Head
Outer Banks Center for Wildlife Education, Corolla
Pisgah Center for Wildlife Education, Pisgah Forest
Rankin Museum of American Heritage, Ellerbe
Roanoke/Cashie River Center, Windsor
Ruby City Gems & Minerals, Franklin
Schiele Museum of Natural History, Gastonia
Walter L. Stasavich Science and Nature Center, Greenville
Weymouth Woods Sandhills Nature Preserve Museum, Moore County
Wilderness Taxidermy and Wildlife Museum, Franklin

North Dakota
Dakota Dinosaur Museum, Dickinson
Frontier Fort and Wildlife Museum, Jamestown
McLean County Historical Society Museums, Washburn
Pfennig Wildlife Museum, Beulah
Pioneer Trails Regional Museum, Bowman

Ohio
Appalachian Forest Museum, Highland County
Ashland County Historical Society Museum
Boonshoft Museum of Discovery, Dayton
Cincinnati Museum of Natural History & Science, Cincinnati
Greater Cleveland Aquarium, Cleveland
Cleveland Museum of Natural History, Cleveland
Hefner Museum of Natural History
Karl Limper Geology Museum, Oxford
Killbuck Valley Museum, Killbuck
Lake Erie Islands Nature and Wildlife Center, Put-in-Bay
Lake Erie Nature & Science Center, Bay Village
Langsdon Mineral Collection, Celina
Museum of Biological Diversity, Columbus
Nature Center at Shaker Lakes, Shaker Heights

Oklahoma
A. D. Buck Museum of Science and History, Tonkawa
Beavers Bend Wildlife Museum, Broken Bow
Elsing Museum, Tulsa
Goddard Youth Museum, Sulphur
Kenton Mercantile Museum, Kenton
Lewis Museum, Lawton
Midgley Museum, Enid
Museum of Osteology, Oklahoma City
Museum of the Great Plains, Lawton
Northwestern Oklahoma State University Natural History Museum, Alva
Richard O. Dodrill's Museum of Rocks, Minerals & Fossils, Cushing
Sam Noble Oklahoma Museum of Natural History, Norman
Timberlake Rose Rock Museum, Noble
Tucker Tower Nature Center, Ardmore
Wildlife Heritage Center Museum, Antlers

Oregon
Columbia Gorge Discovery Center & Museum, The Dalles
Douglas County Museum, Roseburg
Fossil Museum & Pine Creek Schoolhouse, Fossil
Hatfield Marine Science Center, Newport
High Desert Museum, Bend
Hutson Museum, Parkdale
Jensen Arctic Museum, Monmouth
John Day Fossil Beds National Monument, Grant & Wheeler Counties
Mount Angel Abbey Museum, Mount Angel
Oregon Paleo Lands Institute Center, Fossil
Rice Northwest Museum of Rocks and Minerals, Hillsboro
Rogue River Museum, Gold Beach
Sinnott Memorial Observation Station, Crater Lake National Park
Umpqua Discovery Center, Reedsport
University of Oregon Museum of Natural and Cultural History, Eugene
World Forestry Center, Portland

Pennsylvania
Academy of Natural Sciences of Drexel University, Philadelphia
Carnegie Museum of Natural History, Pittsburgh
Center for PostNatural History, Pittsburgh
Delaware County Institute of Science, Media
Earth and Mineral Sciences Museum and Art Gallery, University Park
Everhart Museum, Scranton
Four Mills Barn, Ambler
Frost Entomological Museum, University Park
Insectarium, Philadelphia
Mütter Museum, Philadelphia
North Museum of Natural History and Science, Lancaster
Oakes Museum of Natural History, Mechanicsburg
Reading Public Museum, West Reading
Schisler Museum of Wildlife & Natural History and McMunn Planetarium, East Stroudsburg
State Museum of Pennsylvania, Harrisburg
Tom Ridge Environmental Center, Erie
Wagner Free Institute of Science, Philadelphia

Rhode Island
Edna Lawrence Nature Lab at the Rhode Island School of Design, Providence
Norman Bird Sanctuary, Middletown
Roger Williams Park Museum of Natural History and Planetarium, Providence

South Carolina
Bob Campbell Geology Museum, Clemson
Brookgreen Gardens, Murrells Inlet
Charleston Museum, Charleston
Clemson University Arthropod Collection, Clemson
Coastal Discovery Museum, Hilton Head Island
Congaree National Park, Richland County
Edisto Island Museum, Edisto Island
Hobcaw Barony Discovery Center, Georgetown
Horry County Museum, Conway
Mace Brown Museum of Natural History, Charleston
McKissick Museum, Columbia
Museum & Railroad Historical Center of Greenwood, Greenwood
Museum of York County, Rock Hill
Ravenel Caw Caw Interpretive Center, Ravenel
Roper Mountain Science Center, Greenville
South Carolina Botanical Garden, Clemson
South Carolina State Museum, Columbia

South Dakota
Badlands Petrified Garden, Kadoka
Bays Mountain Park, Kingsport
Ben Reifel Visitor Center, Badlands National Park
Black Hills Institute of Geological Research, Hill City
Buffalo Interpretive Center, Fort Pierre
Dacotah Prairie Museum, Aberdeen
Delbridge Museum, Sioux Falls
Grand River Museum, Lemmon
Heritage Hall Museum, Freeman
The Journey Museum and Learning Center, Rapid City
Lewis and Clark Center Visitor Center, Yankton
Peter Norbeck Center, Custer
Petrified Wood Park, Lemmon
The Mammoth Site, Hot Springs
South Dakota School of Mines and Technology Museum of Geology, Rapid City
W. H. Over Museum, Vermillion
Wind Cave National Park, Hot Springs

Tennessee
Coon Creek Science Center, Adamsville
Discovery Center at Murfree Spring, Murfreesboro
Earth Experience: The Middle Tennessee Museum of Natural History, Murfreesboro
Gray Fossil Museum, Gray
Lichterman Nature Center, Memphis
McClung Museum of Natural History and Culture, Knoxville
Pink Palace Museum and Planetarium, Memphis

Texas
Amarillo College Natural History Museum, Amarillo
Austin Nature & Science Center, Austin
Bay Education Center, Rockport
Beverly S. Sheffield Education Center, Austin
Brazosport Museum of Natural Science, Clute
Brookshire's World of Wildlife Museum and Country Store, Tyler
Brazos Valley Museum of Natural History, Bryan
Buckhorn Museum, San Antonio
Carson County Square House Museum, Panhandle
Centennial Museum and Chihuahuan Desert Gardens, El Paso
Corpus Christi Museum of Science and History, Corpus Christi
Dinosaur Valley State Park, Glen Rose
Don Harrington Discovery Center, Amarillo
El Campo Museum of Natural History, El Campo
Fiedler Memorial Museum, Seguin
Fort Worth Museum of Science and History, Fort Worth
Harber Wildlife Museum, Sherman
Heard Natural Science Museum and Wildlife Sanctuary, McKinney
Houston Museum of Natural Science, Houston
Houston Museum of Natural Science at Sugarland, Sugarland
John C. Freeman Weather Museum, Houston
John E. Conner Museum, Kingsville
Mayborn Museum Complex, Waco
Moody Gardens, Galveston
Museum of Texas Tech University, Lubbock
Naranjo Museum of Natural History, Lufkin
Odessa Meteor Crater, Odessa
Panhandle–Plains Historical Museum, Canyon
Perot Museum of Nature and Science, Dallas
Texas Forestry Museum, Lufkin
Texas Freshwater Fisheries Center, Athens
Texas Memorial Museum, Austin
Waco Mammoth National Monument, Waco
White Rock Lake Museum, Dallas
Whiteside Museum of Natural History, Seymour
Witte Museum, San Antonio

Utah
Arches National Park, Moab
Box Elder Museum, Brigham City
Bryce Canyon National Park, Bryce
Bryce Museum, Bryce
BYU Museum of Paleontology, Provo
Canyonlands National Park, Moab
Capitol Reef National Park, Torrey
Cleveland-Lloyd Dinosaur Quarry, Cleveland
Dan O'Laurie Museum of Moab, Moab
The Dinosaur Museum, Blanding
Dinosaur National Monument, Vernal
Eccles Dinosaur Park, Ogden
Fairview Museum of History and Art, Fairview
Grand Staircase–Escalante National Monument, Kane & Garfield Counties
Great Basin Museum, Delta
John Hutchings Museum of Natural History, Lehi
Monte L. Bean Life Science Museum, Provo
Moqui Cave, Kanab
Museum of Ancient Life, Lehi
Museum of Moab, Moab
Museum of the San Rafael Swell, Castle Dale
Natural History Museum of Utah, Salt Lake City
Paunsaugunt Western Wildlife Museum, Bryce
Rosenbruch Wildlife Museum, St. George
St. George Dinosaur Discovery Site at Johnson Farm, St. George
Utah Field House of Natural History, Vernal
Utah State University Eastern Prehistoric Museum, Price
Weber State University Museum of Natural Science, Ogden

Vermont
Birds of Vermont Museum, Huntington
ECHO, Leahy Center for Lake Champlain, Burlington
Fairbanks Museum and Planetarium, St. Johnsbury
Montshire Museum of Science, Norwich
National Museum of the Morgan Horse, Middlebury
Nature Museum at Grafton, Grafton
Perkins Geology Museum, Burlington
Southern Vermont Natural History Museum, Marlboro

Virginia
Esther Thomas Atkinson Museum, Hampden Sydney
Hermitage Foundation Museum and Gardens, Norfolk
Hostetter Museum of Natural History, Eastern Mennonite University, Harrisonburg
James Madison University Mineral Museum, Harrisonburg
Luray Caverns, Luray
Maymont, Richmond
Museum of Geosciences, Blacksburg
Museum of the Middle Appalachians, Saltville
Philpott Lake Visitor Center, Bassett
Radford University Museum of the Earth Sciences, Radford
Science Museum of Virginia, Richmond
Virginia Aquarium & Marine Science Center, Virginia Beach
Virginia Institute of Marine Science, Gloucester Point
Virginia Living Museum, Newport News
Virginia Museum of Natural History, Martinsville

Washington
Breazeale Interpretive Center, Skagit County
Burke Museum of Natural History and Culture, Seattle
Charles R. Conner Museum, Pullman
Coastal Interpretive Center, Ocean Shores
Cougar Mountain Zoo Wildlife Museum, Issaquah
Forest Learning Center, Mount St. Helens National Volcanic Monument
Ginkgo Petrified Forest State Park, Vantage
Hanford Reach Interpretive Center, Richland
Karshner Museum, Puyallup
Longmire Museum, Mount Rainier National Park
Moses Lake Museum and Art Center, Moses Lake
Mount St. Helens Visitor Center at Silver Lake, Silver Lake (Cowlitz County)
Of Sea & Shore Museum, Port Gamble
Port Townsend Marine Science Center, Port Townsend
Poulsbo Marine Science Center, Poulsbo
Robert P Worthman Anatomy Museum, Pullman
Slater Museum of Natural History, Tacoma
Stonerose Interpretive Center and Fossil Site, Republic
Verlot Ranger Station-Public Service Center, Granite Falls
Wenatchee Valley Museum & Cultural Center, Wenatchee
The Whale Museum, Friday Harbor
Whatcom Museum, Bellingham

West Virginia
Lost World Caverns, Lewisburg
Seneca Rocks Discovery Center, Seneca Rocks
West Virginia Geological and Economic Survey's Mini-Museum of Geology & Natural History, Morgantown
West Virginia State Museum, Charleston

Wisconsin
Cable Natural History Museum, Cable
Camp Five Museum, Laona
Dinosaur Discovery Museum, Kenosha
Flyways Waterfowl Museum, Baraboo
James Newman Clark Bird Museum, Eau Claire
Hoard Historical Museum, Fort Atkinson
Kenosha Public Museum, Kenosha
Milwaukee Public Museum, Milwaukee
Neville Public Museum of Brown County, Green Bay
New London Public Museum, New London
Northern Great Lakes Visitor Center, Ashland
Oshkosh Public Museum, Oshkosh
Stierle Bird Collection, Marshfield
University of Wisconsin–Stevens Point Museum of Natural History, Stevens Point
UW–Madison Geology Museum, Madison
Weis Earth Science Museum, University of Wisconsin–Oshkosh, Fox Cities Campus, Menasha
Wisconsin Museum of International Wildlife, Appleton

Wyoming
Draper Museum of Natural History, Buffalo Bill Historical Center, Cody
Craig Thomas Discovery and Visitor Center, Moose
Devils Tower National Monument, Hulett
Fishing Bridge Museum, Yellowstone National Park
Fossil Butte National Monument, Kemmerer
Madison Museum, Yellowstone National Park
National Bighorn Sheep Interpretive Center, Dubois
Nelson Museum of the West, Cheyenne
Norris Geyser Basin Museum, Yellowstone National Park
Paleon Museum, Glenrock
Tate Geological Museum, Casper
University of Wyoming Geological Museum, Laramie
University of Wyoming Insect Museum, Laramie
Washakie Museum & Cultural Center, Worland
Weidner Wildlife Museum, Rock Springs
Werner Wildlife Museum, Casper
Western History Center, Lingle
Wind River Heritage Center, Riverton
Wyoming Dinosaur Center, Thermopolis
Wyoming State Museum, Cheyenne

See also
 List of science centers in the United States
 List of museums in the United States
 List of natural history museums
List of university museums in the United States

References

Natural history